Chaetostoma lexa is a species of armored catfish only known from streams and rivers that feed into the Huallaga River near Tingo María, Leoncio Prado Province, Peru. This species grows to a length of  SL. The genus Loraxichthys is a synonym of Chaetostoma.

References

lexa
Fish described in 2013